Saint Joseph is an unincorporated community in Mercer County, in the U.S. state of Ohio.

History
Saint Joseph was laid out in 1861, and named after the local St. Joseph's Catholic Church.

References

Unincorporated communities in Mercer County, Ohio
Unincorporated communities in Ohio